A doré bar is a semi-pure alloy of gold and silver. It is usually created at the site of a mine and then transported to a refinery for further purification.

The proportions of silver and gold can vary widely.  Doré bars weigh as much as 25 kg.

During the 19th century gold rushes, gold nuggets and dust were melted into crude gold bars mistakenly called "bullion" by miners.  They were, more accurately, doré bars with higher contents of silver and other adulterants than the mints would accept.  Mint and private assayers would subsequently refine the doré bars to an acceptable purity, 999 fine, gold bullion, with the silver and base metals removed.  By the time of the California gold rush, mints were moving away from the age-old process of cupellation to "part" bullion and moving toward the acid refining process developed by chemist Joseph Louis Gay-Lussac for the French mint.  By the time of the Klondike gold rush, mints were replacing Gay-Lussac's acid process and introducing electrolysis to refine doré bars into 999.9 purity gold bullion.

Associated industry codes 
According to the United States Census Bureau, the creation of doré bars is conducted at establishments engaged either in "Gold Ore Mining" (NAICS Code 212221), or "Primary Smelting and Refining of Nonferrous Metal (except Copper and Aluminum)" (NAICS Code 331419).

Derivation of the term 
The word  is French for "gilded" or "golden".

See also 
 Bullion
 Bullion coin
 Electrum
 Gold bar
 Gold extraction
 Gold mining
 Ore genesis
 Smelting

References

External links 
 Doré Bullion
 Ore Processing from mine to Doré production, from Newmont Waihi
 Photograph of a doré bar weighing 17.42 kg
 Categories of gold bar: 'Dore' Bars

Gold mining
Silver mining